Bilu Rakkhosh: A Demon Within is a Bengali drama film by debutant director Indrasis Acharya, Produced by Amit Debnath and Anirban Maity. This film was presented by Tripod Entertainment in association with Aalekh. The story is a journey of a modern IT executive who has an inclination towards music. It’s a story of different psychological situations through a man’s mundane daily life and how he loses his soul. The music is released by Amara Muzik.

Plot

The film delineates the journey of a bright mind which is tormented by contradiction in the scenario of rapid socio technical age. He has a lucrative yet anxiety ridden vocation which does not allow him to nurture his long cherished dream to be a singer. His life is squandered as he is unable to settle equilibrium between family obligation and personal ambition. He is like the desperate sailor whose ship is on the verge of sinking. In his mind he creates a utopia and oscillates between past and present helplessly to capture an ideal locale. The film offers an open ending for the viewers to find out the demon’s lot.

Cast
Joy Sengupta as Bilu
Koneenica Banerjee as Sohini
Kanchana Moitra as Ranu
Rony Dasgupta as Priyadip-Friend of Bilu 
Pradip Mukherjee as Father of Bilu
Papiya Sen
Moumita Mitra as Mala
Arijit Chackrabarty as Arijit-Friend of Bilu 
Deboprasad Halder as Deb
Anirban Banerjee as Chiranjib - Friend of Bilu
Rajanya Laha as Childhood of Bilu

Production 
Produced by Amit Debnath and Anirban Maity and presented by Tripod Entertainment in association with Aalekh.

Soundtrack
The music of the film is composed by Joy Sarkar.

Recognition
To date, Bilu Rakkhosh has received following nominations:

 Official Selection New York Indian Film festival in Competition 
 Nominated for Best Actor Category in New York Indian Film Festival 
 Official Selection Jagran Film Festival in Competition 
 Official selection Third Eye Asian Film Festival 
 Official selection Bodhisattva International Film Festival in Competition  
 Official Selection Habitat Film Festival 
 Official nomination Asia pacific screen awards

References

External links
 
 https://web.archive.org/web/20170914172531/https://trendingstoryline.com/bilu-rakkhosh-review/

2017 films
Bengali-language Indian films
Films set in Kolkata
2010s Bengali-language films
Indian drama films
2017 drama films